Lists of Members of the Parliament of the United Kingdom (MPs) for United Kingdom constituencies in England.

By parliament 

 List of MPs for constituencies in England (2005–2010)
 List of MPs for constituencies in England (2010–2015)
 List of MPs for constituencies in England (2015–2017)
 List of MPs for constituencies in England (2017–2019)
 List of MPs for constituencies in England (2019–present)

By location 

 List of MPs of Colchester, 1885–1983
 List of MPs for constituencies in the East Midlands region 2010–15
 List of Members of Parliament in Kent
 List of Members of Parliament for Wolverhampton

See also 

 List of parliaments of the United Kingdom

Lists of MPs for constituencies in England
Lists of British MPs